Anisopoda is a flowering plant genus with only one species: Anisopoda bupleuroides.  The genus is in the Apiaceae and is endemic to Madagascar.

References 

Endemic flora of Madagascar
Apioideae
Taxa named by John Gilbert Baker
Monotypic Apioideae genera